Clifton Beach is a coastal suburb in the Cairns Region, Queensland, Australia.

Geography
Clifton Beach is located about 22 kilometres north of the city centre of Cairns on the Coral Sea. To the west, the mountains of the Macallister Range form the border with the Kuranda State Forest (→ Kuranda). The suburb of Kewarra Beach lies to the south and Palm Cove to the north. The Captain Cook Highway runs through the suburb.

To the east, the suburb is bordered by a long sandy beach. The beach, which is affected by erosion, is not very wide, especially in the south, and is almost completely submerged at high tide. To prevent erosion damage, it is protected by rocky groynes. It is only suitable for bathing to a limited extent, as it is often visited by crocodiles. In the first half of the calendar year, so-called "stinger" jellyfish also appear. Contact with their tentacles often causes considerable pain and occasionally even danger to life. In the north of the beach there is a bathing facility protected by nets, which also offers sufficient protection from crocodiles. There are also some barbecue areas.

Maps

History
Clifton Beach is situated in the Djabugay (Tjapukai) traditional Aboriginal country. 

In the early post-war years, sugar cane farmer William Fairweather laid out an access road to his farm. The Mulgrave Shire Council at the time named the area after the birthplace of his wife, who was from in Clifton in the Darling Downs of southern Queensland. Alternatively, it is believed that the suburb was named after Clifton in Perthshire, Scotland, the birthplace of Mary Hunter Smart, a settler around 1880.

Clifton Beach was officially declared a suburb on 2 May 1959. In 1969, a post office was opened. In the 1970s, construction and road improvements began. By the 1980s, there were three trailer parks and a jellyfish-safe swimming facility. Clifton Beach was a mixture of residential and holiday resort with a rural atmosphere.

There are older houses and tourist facilities from this period on Arlington Esplanade running along the beach. A community centre was built a short distance back from the esplanade and local shops sold everyday goods, arts and crafts. The Wild World Zoo, later called the Cairns Tropical Zoo, opened on the Captain Cook Highway and attracted traffic.

In the second half of the 1980s, the population increased by about two-thirds. Growth continued into the 2000s. A middle to upper class suburb emerged with a large number of retirees. The area between the highway and the beach was almost entirely built up, while the other side of the highway, which borders the Kuranda State Forest and accounts for about two-thirds of Clifton Beach, remained largely undeveloped.

A shopping centre was built on Captain Cook Highway. A 2004 expansion added a supermarket operated by the national Coles chain, making the suburb even more attractive and attracting shoppers from neighbouring suburbs. The nearest major shopping centre is about halfway to Cairns city in Smithfield.

The median price for three-bedroom houses between October 2021 and September 2022 was about $720,000, and the median for rentals was $600 per week for the corresponding period

Amenities 
There are no schools or the like in Clifton Beach. The post office is in the shopping centre, the Clifton Village Shopping Centre on Captain Cook Highway, which is accessible via Endeavour Road and where you will also find doctors, a few other shops for local needs and restaurants. The latter close early. There are more eating establishments in the more touristy Palm Cove, about two to three kilometres away. There is some accommodations for tourists. In the centre, there is a bar and grill restaurant, but it also closes early. It "does a roaring trade of breakfast cocktails because locals struggle with the crushing weight of reality and like to be legless by noon".

There are a number of parks in the suburb, including:

 Eddy Street Park
 Edward Mann Park

Images

References

External links 

 "Clifton_Beach48571", Queensland place names search, Queensland Government
 "Clifton Beach", Queensland Places, University of Queensland

Suburbs of Cairns
Beaches of Queensland
Coastline of Queensland